XOFTspy Portable Anti-Spyware is a proprietary application that ParetoLogic Inc. developed for Microsoft Windows computers. The anti-spyware program runs from a USB drive and protects users from malicious threats. While the software is free to download and scan, the user must purchase a license to clean. The license is valid for cleaning multiple computers from the same U3 USB drive.

Portability can be useful in situations where a computer is heavily infected, bogged down, or sluggish. By accessing the computer directly from a U3 device, XOFTspy Portable removes malware items even if the computer is infected and unable to download other anti-spyware programs.

The product name "XOFTspy" has been retired, and the new product name is now "DigitalCare".

See also
 Spy software
 Rootkits
 Employee monitoring software
 Computer insecurity
 Defensive computing

References 

Spyware removal
Windows security software
Windows-only software
Shareware